NX, formerly known as "unigraphics", is an advanced high-end CAD/CAM/CAE, which has been owned since 2007 by Siemens Digital Industries Software. In 2000, Unigraphics purchased SDRC I-DEAS and began an effort to integrate aspects of both software packages into a single product which became Unigraphics NX or NX.

It is used, among other tasks, for:
 Design (parametric and direct solid/surface modelling)
 Engineering analysis (static; dynamic; electro-magnetic; thermal, using the finite element method; and fluid, using the finite volume method).
 Manufacturing finished design by using included machining modules.

NX is a direct competitor to CATIA, Creo, and Autodesk Inventor.

History
1972:
United Computing, Inc. releases UNIAPT, one of the world's first end-user CAM products.

1973: 
The company purchases the Automated Drafting and Machining (ADAM) software code from MCS in 1973. The code became a foundation for a product called UNI-GRAPHICS, later sold commercially as Unigraphics in 1975.

1976 McDonnell Douglas Corporation buys United Computing.

1983: 
UniSolids V1.0 is released, marking the industry's first true interactive Solid Modeling software offering.

1991:
During a period of financial difficulties McDonnell Douglas Automation Company (McAuto) sells its commercial services organization, including the Unigraphics organization and product, to EDS which at that time is owned by GM. Unigraphics becomes GM's corporate CAD system.

1992:
Over 21,000 seats of Unigraphics are being used worldwide.

1996:
Unigraphics V11.0 is released with enhancements in Industrial Design and Modeling including Bridge Surface, Curvature Analysis for Curve and Surfaces, Face Blends, Variable Offset Surface, etc. In the area of Assembly Modeling the new capabilities include Component Filters, Faceted Representations, and Clearance Analysis between multiple Components.  A fully integrated Spreadsheet linked to Feature-Based Modeling is also included..

2002 
First release of the new "Next Generation" version of Unigraphics and I-DEAS,  called NX, beginning the transition to bring the functionality and capabilities of both Unigraphics and I-DEAS together into a single consolidated product.

2007
Introduction of Synchronous Technology in NX 5.

2011
Release of NX8 on October 17-2011

2013
Release of NX9 (x64 only) on October 14-2013

Release history

Key functions
Computer-aided design (CAD) (Design)
Parametric solid modeling (feature-based and direct modeling)
Freeform surface modelling, class A surfaces.
Reverse engineering
Styling and computer-aided industrial design
Product and manufacturing information (PMI)
Reporting and analytics, verification and validation
Knowledge reuse, including knowledge-based engineering
Sheet metal design
Assembly modelling and digital mockup
Routing for electrical wiring and mechanical piping
Computer-aided engineering (CAE) (Simulation)
Stress analysis / finite element method (FEM)
Kinematics
Computational fluid dynamics (CFD) and thermal analysis
Computer-aided manufacturing (CAM) (Manufacturing)
Numerical control (NC) programming

Supported operating systems and platforms
NX runs on Linux, Microsoft Windows and Mac OS.

Starting with version 1847, support for Windows versions prior to Windows 10 as well as for macOS was completely removed, and the GUI was removed from the Linux version.

Architecture 
NX uses Parasolid for its Geometric modeling kernel and D-Cubed as Associative engine for sketcher and assembly constraints as well as using JT (visualization format) for lightweight data and Multi-CAD.

See also
CATIA
Freecad
I-DEAS
Inventor
PTC Creo
Solid Edge
SolidWorks

References

Gallery

:Category:Screenshots of NX (Unigraphics)

External links 

Computer-aided design software
Computer-aided manufacturing software
Computer-aided engineering software
Product lifecycle management
Computer-aided design software for Linux
Siemens software products
Computer-aided manufacturing software for Linux
Computer-aided engineering software for Linux
Proprietary commercial software for Linux